Igor Pastukhovich (born 14 November 1966) is a Soviet former cyclist. He competed in the team time trial at the 1992 Summer Olympics for the Unified Team.

References

1966 births
Living people
Soviet male cyclists
Olympic cyclists of the Unified Team
Cyclists at the 1992 Summer Olympics
Place of birth missing (living people)